Supranational elections held in 2019.

May
5 May:  Central American Parliament, 
23–26 May: European Union, European Parliament

June
16 June: Central American Parliament, Guatemala

References

2019 elections
Supranational elections
2019
Political timelines of the 2010s by year